I'm The One That I Want is a concert movie released in 2000. The film captures a live performance of a one-woman show of stand-up comedy, featuring actress and comedian Margaret Cho.

Premise 
The film combines elements of storytelling and stand-up. It showcases Cho's unique style of sexually blunt monologue performance. The primary focus of the material is on Cho's ascension into stardom and her struggles with weight, drug addiction and sexual promiscuity. Cho also addresses her failed sitcom All American Girl, racism, homophobia and other challenges.

Production notes 
The performance was filmed at the Warfield Theater in San Francisco on November 13, 1999. The movie was almost universally praised by critics, and it garnered favorable comparisons to the work of comedians like Richard Pryor and Lenny Bruce.

Book, CD, DVD and VHS 
A book of the same name was also released, as well as a compact disc. The CD is a live audio recording of the same performance at the Warfield Theater. There is also a CD version of the book available, and it is read by Cho. The concert film was released on DVD and VHS on October 9, 2001 by Winstar Home Video.

References

External links
I'm the One That I Want at the Internet Movie Database

2000 films
2000 comedy films
Films about Korean Americans
Comedy films about Asian Americans
Margaret Cho albums
Asian-American LGBT-related films
2000s English-language films
2000s American films